Fiestas Patrias is a Spanish phrase meaning "Patriotic Holidays" or "National Holidays". It may refer to:

 Fiestas Patrias (Mexico), a set of Mexican holidays
 Fiestas Patrias (Chile), the Independence Day celebration of Chile
 Fiestas Patrias (Panama), a series of holidays in Panama (see Public holidays in Panama)
 Fiestas Patrias (Peru), the national independence holidays of Peru
 Dias Patrios (Guatemala), the national independence holidays of Guatemala